New Taipei City Constituency VII includes the eastern part of Banqiao in New Taipei City. The district was formerly known as Taipei County Constituency VII (2008-2010) and was created in 2008, when all local constituencies of the Legislative Yuan were reorganized to become single-member districts.

Current district
 Banqiao:
 urban villages (61 in total): Jiuru(九如里), Da'an(大安里), Dafeng(大豐里), Daguan(大觀里), Zhongshan(中山里), Wuquan(五權里), Ren'ai(仁愛里), Zhengtai(正泰里), Minsheng(民生里), Minzu(民族里),Yuguang(玉光里), Guangren(光仁里), Guangfu(光復里), Chenghe(成和里), Xi'an(西安里), Heping(和平里), Juren(居仁里), Dongqiu(東丘里), Dong'an(東安里),Chang'an(長安里), Changshou(長壽里),  Xinyi(信義里), Houpu(後埔里), Chongqing(重慶里), Xiangqiu(香丘里), Puqian(埔墘里), Zhenxing(振興里), Zhenyi(振義里), Haishan(海山里), Fuzhou(浮洲里),Guotai(國泰里), Chuntang(堂春里), Kunlun(崑崙里), Shenqiu(深丘里), Fugui(富貴里), Fuxing(復興里), Jingxing(景星里),Huazhong(華中里), Huadong(華東里), Huagui(華貴里), Huafu(華福里), Huade(華德里), Huaxing(華興里), Xiangyun(鄉雲里), Xibei(溪北里), Xizhou(溪洲里), Xifu(溪福里), Qiaozhong(僑中里),Fuqiu(福丘里), Fu'an(福安里), Fuxing(福星里), Fulu(福祿里), Fushou(福壽里), Fude(福德里), Ju'an(聚安里), Guangxin(廣新里), Guangfu(廣福里), Guangde(廣德里), Long'an(龍安里), Shuangyu(雙玉里), Huanyuan(歡園里).

Legislators

Election results

 

 
 
 
 
 
 
 
 

2008 establishments in Taiwan
Constituencies in New Taipei